Live in Front of a Studio Audience is a series of live television specials that was first broadcast by ABC on May 22, 2019. Conceptualized and hosted by Jimmy Kimmel, the specials feature all-star casting for live recreations of sitcom episodes that originally aired in the 1970s and 1980s.

The specials are co-produced by Norman Lear's Act III Communications, Kimmel's Kimmelot, and Will Ferrell's Gary Sanchez Productions — in association with Sony Pictures Television Studios (owner of the rights to the original series) via the ownership of the Embassy Television library (the original producer of All in the Family and its spin-offs The Jeffersons and Good Times).

The first special recreated two episodes involving George Jefferson (played by Jamie Foxx), with All in the Family represented by "Henry's Farewell" (the character's on-screen debut) and "A Friend in Need" (the first episode of The Jeffersons). The first special was seen by 10.4 million viewers; a repeat was seen by 2.49 million viewers. The second special was broadcast on December 18, 2019, and recreated another All in the Family episode and an episode of Good Times.

A third special recreated The Facts of Life third-season episode "Kids Can Be Cruel" and Diff'rent Strokess first-season episode "Willis' Privacy" It aired on December 7, 2021.

History
All in the Family is about a working-class white family living in Queens, New York. Its patriarch is Archie Bunker (Carroll O'Connor), an outspoken, narrow-minded man. Archie's wife Edith (Jean Stapleton) is sweet and understanding, though somewhat naïve and uneducated; her husband sometimes disparagingly calls her "dingbat." Their only child, daughter Gloria (Sally Struthers), is generally kind and good-natured like her mother, but displays traces of her father's stubbornness and temper; unlike them, however, she is a feminist. Gloria is married to college student Michael Stivic (Rob Reiner)referred to as "Meathead" by Archiewhose values are likewise influenced and shaped by the counterculture of the 1960s. The two couples represent the real-life clash of values between the Greatest Generation and Baby Boomers. For much of the series, the Stivics live in the Bunkers' home to save money, providing abundant opportunity for them to irritate each other. – The show is set in the Astoria section of Queens, with the vast majority of scenes taking place in the Bunkers' home at 704 Hauser Street. Occasional scenes take place in other locations, especially during later seasons, such as Kelsey's Bar, a neighborhood tavern where Archie spends a good deal of time and which he eventually purchases, and the Stivics' home after Mike and Gloria move to the house next door. The house seen in the opening is at 89-70 Cooper Avenue near the junction of the Glendale, Forest Hills, and Rego Park sections of Queens. Supporting characters represent the demographics of the neighborhood, especially the Jeffersons, a black family, who live in the house next door in the early seasons.

The Jeffersons focuses on George and Louise Jefferson, an African-American couple who have been able to move from Queens to Manhattan owing to the success of George's dry-cleaner chain. The show was launched as the second spin-off of All in the Family, on which the Jeffersons had been the neighbors of Archie and Edith Bunker. The show was the creation of Norman Lear. The Jeffersons eventually evolved into more of a traditional sitcom but did reference such issues as alcoholism, racism, suicide, gun control, being transgender, and adult illiteracy. The epithets "nigger" and "honky" were used occasionally, especially during the earlier seasons.

Good Times focuses on James and Florida Evans and their three children living in a housing project in inner-city Chicago with their exuberant neighbor and Florida's best friend Willona Woods. The series was a spin-off of Maude (which was itself a spin-off of All in the Family). Florida was employed as Maude Findlay's housekeeper in Tuckahoe, New York, and James (named "Henry") was employed as a New York City firefighter. When Florida and Henry moved to Good Times, the producers decided to change the characters' history to fit a new series that was well into development rather than start from scratch to create a consistent starring vehicle. Henry's name was changed to James, and there was no mention of anything connected to Maude. Good Times was set in a traditional sitcom format, but dealt with serious issues of poverty, social class, racism, addiction, alcoholism, gang violence, gun violence, child abuse, homelessness, and politics. Controversially, in later seasons the show increasingly focused on the popular character of J.J., the Evans' oldest son, whom some critics, including the actors who played his parents, considered a negative stereotype of African-Americans.

The Facts of Life is a spin-off of Diff'rent Strokes in which the Drummonds' housekeeper, Mrs. Garrett, moves to Peekskill, New York to work as the housemother of a dormitory at Eastland, an all-girls boarding school. Unusually for a spin-off, it premiered less than a year after the series that spawned it. Owing to its setting in a dormitory, the first season features a large cast of students, but in the second season, the cast was streamlined substantially and for the majority of the show's run, it focuses on Mrs. Garrett and four core girls: spoiled Blair, naive Natalie, gossipy Tootie, and tough Jo. The show's school-based setting combined with its long run necessitated a thematic shift in season five in which Mrs. Garrett leaves Eastland to open a gourmet food shop in Peekskill, and the four core girls come to live with her behind the shop as they attend different schools and work for Mrs. Garrett.

Diff'rent Strokes is about a pair of working-class African-American children from Harlem, New York, Arnold and Willis Jackson, who are taken in and eventually adopted by wealthy white industrialist Philip Drummond upon the death of their mother, Mr. Drummond's housekeeper. Other members of the Drummond household include Mr. Drummond's teenage daughter, Kimberly, and his new housekeeper, Edna Garrett; Mrs. Garrett departed for her own series midway through the second season and was succeeded by two other housekeepers. Early episodes deal with the culture shock of two children of limited means suddenly being vaulted into high society, but these themes were largely dropped in later seasons as the Jackson brothers became used to their privileged life on Park Avenue and began referring to Mr. Drummond as "Dad." Nonetheless, the sitcom continued to address serious issues such as drug abuse, child sexual abuse, disabilities and eating disorders. In doing so, it became one of the era's best-known purveyors of the very special episode.

Cast

Co-hosts
 Norman Lear
 Jimmy Kimmel

Guest Stars
Martin Short as Himself – performing the theme song from The Facts of Life in the second special
 Ja'Net DuBois, Jimmie Walker, and Bern Nadette Stanis as Themselves – cast members on the original series of Good Times
 Junkyard Dog – original cast member of Diff'rent Strokes
 Lisa Whelchel, Mindy Cohn and Kim Fields – original cast members of The Facts of Life

All in the Family
 Woody Harrelson as Archie Bunker (also performing the theme song, "Those Were the Days")
 Marisa Tomei as Edith Bunker (also performing the theme song, "Those Were the Days")
 Ellie Kemper as Gloria Stivic
 Ike Barinholtz as Mike "Meathead" Stivic
 Anthony Anderson as Henry Jefferson (for "Henry's Farewell")
 Jamie Foxx as George Jefferson (for "Henry's Farewell") 
 Sean Hayes as Frank Lorenzo (for "Henry's Farewell")
 Kevin Bacon as Pinky Peterson (for "The Draft Dodger")
 Jesse Eisenberg as David Brewster (for "The Draft Dodger")
 Justina Machado as Teresa Betancourt (for "The Draft Dodger")

The Jeffersons
 Jamie Foxx as George Jefferson
 Wanda Sykes as Louise Jefferson
 Kerry Washington as Helen Willis
 Will Ferrell as Tom Willis
 Marla Gibbs as Florence Johnston
 Fran Bennett as Mother Olivia Jefferson
 Jovan Adepo as Lionel Jefferson
 Amber Stevens West as Jenny Willis Jefferson
 Stephen Tobolowsky as Harry Bentley
 Jackée Harry as Diane Stockwell
 Jennifer Hudson as Herself (performing the theme song, "Movin' On Up")

Good Times
 Andre Braugher as James Evans Sr.
 Viola Davis as Florida Evans
 Tiffany Haddish as Willona Woods
 Jay Pharoah as James "J.J." Evans Jr.
 Corinne Foxx as Thelma Evans
 Asante Blackk as Michael Evans
 John Amos as Fred Davis
 Jharrel Jerome as Jimmy Pierson
 Anthony Anderson as Himself and Patti LaBelle as Herself (performing the self-titled theme song)

The Facts of Life
 Ann Dowd as Edna Garrett
 Jennifer Aniston as Blair Warner
 Gabrielle Union as Tootie Ramsey
 Allison Tolman as Natalie Green
 Kathryn Hahn as Jo Polniaczek
 Will Arnett as Dink Lockwood
 Jason Bateman as Tim Holifield
 Jon Stewart as Carl “Rocky” Price
 Noah Lapook
 Lisa Whelchel as Herself (performing the self-titled theme song)

Diff'rent Strokes
 John Lithgow as Mr. Philip Drummond
 Kevin Hart as Arnold Jackson
 Damon Wayans as Willis Jackson
 Ann Dowd as Edna Garrett
 Snoop Dogg as Vernon
 Shawn Stockman and Wanya Morris (from Boyz II Men) as Themselves (performing the self-titled theme song)

Episodes recreated

Production
The first special was announced on April 19, 2019 (which aired May 22). Jimmy Kimmel deemed All in the Family and The Jeffersons as his favorite TV series of all-time, and stated: "the fact that a group of Oscar winners eagerly agreed to play these iconic characters is a testament to the greatness of these shows and their creator, Norman Lear." On May 10, 2019, it was announced that Anthony Anderson, Ike Barinholtz, and Sean Hayes would be part of the cast.

Live in Front of a Studio Audience was broadcast from the Sony Pictures Studios lot in Culver City, California. Many of the details regarding the special, including which episodes would be performed, guest stars, and other aspects, were kept as surprises to encourage viewership. Lear remarked that "the whole thing was Jimmy's idea", and that the two shows' relevance remained the same in the current political climate, explaining that "seriously, the most amazing thing is listening to these two shows where we agreed word for word — we would not change a word, and nothing has been changed". Lear also hoped that the special could become a larger franchise in its own right.

Justina Machado was originally announced as playing Florence Johnston; however, during the live broadcast, original The Jeffersons cast member Marla Gibbs made a surprise appearance to reprise her role as Florence. Veteran actress Fran Bennett portrayed Mother Jefferson. The original episodes aired between 1973 and 1976 on CBS, respectively.

A second special was announced on November 5, 2019 (which aired December 18), featuring episodes of All in the Family and Good Times. On December 11, 2019, it was announced that Harrelson, Tomei, Kemper, and Barinholtz would reprise their All in the Family roles, and would be joined by Kevin Bacon, Jesse Eisenberg, and the previously announced Machado in yet to be revealed roles. It was also revealed that Anderson, who previously played Henry Jefferson in the first special, and Patti LaBelle would sing the Good Times theme song. The following day, the special's Good Times cast was announced: Viola Davis as Florida Evans, with Andre Braugher as James Evans, Jay Pharaoh as J.J. Evans, Asante Blackk as Michael Evans, Corinne Foxx as Thelma Evans, Tiffany Haddish as Willona Woods, and Jharrel Jerome in another yet-to-be revealed role. ABC also announced that it would air special "retro" promos for its current programming during the broadcast, which were modeled upon ABC's on-air presentation from the mid-1970s and early to mid 80s. Several ABC stations similarly planned to air their own throwback promos for local newscasts during the special, such as network owned-and-operated stations WTVD-TV and WLS-TV. The original broadcast was occasionally interrupted by ABC News special reports of updates on the impeachment of Donald Trump. Nevertheless, the final half hour tied with the Survivor season finale for the number 2 spot, losing to only the season finale of The Masked Singer.

A third special was announced on November 18, 2021, for the principal cast of the Diff'rent Strokes reenactment, and the cast of The Facts of Life reenactment was announced on November 29. It aired December 7.

On January 11, 2022, ABC Entertainment president Craig Erwich confirmed that there would be more installments of Live in Front of a Studio Audience.

Reception

Critical response
Film critic Caroline Framke of Variety felt that "with meticulous attention to set detail and wig shapes, ABC's live staging of 'Henry's Farewell' and 'A Friend in Need' managed to feel both like an artifact of a nostalgic past and the urgent present", noting that Archie had "retained his notoriously ugly streaks of sexism and racism", while the word "nigger" had to be censored from the Jeffersons episode due to current broadcast standards. Framke similarly noted that "some of the punchlines reveal[ed] their age, but as Lear warned us ahead of time, far more hit close to home" (especially if one were to, for example, "swap out every Nixon mention for Trump"), and that "the deja vu does tend to create an extra depressing level to the proceedings." She felt that most of the starring roles were trying to "impersonate" their original actors with mixed results (also noting that Jamie Foxx had broken character to point out his flubbed line, blurting out that "[everyone's] sitting at home thinking their TV is messed up"), but that Marisa Tomei "stole just about every scene", and that they were backed by a supporting cast that "more often than not, have had ample experience on their own comedies borne of the Lear tradition". She concluded that "TV could frankly do a whole lot worse than gathering talented performers to tackle smart, topical comedy with such visceral joy that they're practically vibrating off the screen. That the material remains so stubbornly timely is a bonus — and a warning."

Viewership and ratings
The first special was seen by 10.4 million viewers, with a 1.7 share among viewers 18–49, making it the most-watched program of the night. The live special was followed by a half-hour retrospective on the two shows, All About All in the Family & The Jeffersons (seen by 7.9 million), and the series finale of Whiskey Cavalier (3.64 million). The special also gave ABC its most watched season-closing Wednesday since 2007.

An encore presentation of the special and retrospective were aired on May 25, 2019, with a 0.4/2 rating/share and 2.49 million viewers.

The second special was seen by 5.8 million viewers, with a 1.1 share among viewers 18–49. Despite the massive drop in viewership, the special scored ABC's biggest audience on the Wednesday before Christmas since 2009.

The third special was seen by 4.8 million viewers, with a .96 share among viewers 18–49. Despite the decline in viewership, the special scored the best ratings of the evening.

Accolades

References

External links
 

2010s American television specials
2019 television specials
All in the Family
American Broadcasting Company television specials
American live television shows
English-language television shows
The Jeffersons
Mass media portrayals of the working class
Television remakes
Television series by Sony Pictures Television
Television series created by Norman Lear